The BMW 109-718 was a liquid-fuelled rocket engine developed by BMW at their Bruckmühl facility, in Germany during the Second World War.

Development 
The 109-718 (109 prefix number for the Reichsluftfahrtministerium, or RLM, designation used for all reaction-propulsion [rocket and gas turbine] aviation engine projects) was designed as an assist rocket for aircraft, for rapid takeoffs or to enable them to achieve high-speed sprints, akin to what Americans called "mixed power" postwar. It was combined with a standard BMW 003 jet engine, placed atop the rear turbine casing of the jet engine to create a new variant of it, the 003R, providing a total of  thrust at full power apiece; it was expected the units would be fitted in pairs. Unlike most RATO boosters, the liquid-fuelled 718 rocket engine system comprising the second propulsive source of an 003R engine remained with the airframe at all times.

The rocket motor had internal and external main chambers which were cooled by the nitric acid oxidiser, fed through a coiled spiral tube. The 718's fuel pumps were driven by a power take-off from the jet engine which ran at 3,000 rpm.

The 109-718 was also tested aboard an He 162E, although records do not indicate the results of this test. 

The Germans hoped the rocket might eventually rely on the same fuel as jet aircraft.

Only twenty 109-718 engines were completed by war's end, each taking some 100 hours to complete.

Specifications

Notes

Citations

Bibliography

Aircraft rocket engines
BMW aircraft engines
BMW rocket engines